Euaresta toba is a species of fruit fly in the genus Euaresta of the family Tephritidae.

Distribution
Argentina.

References

Tephritinae
Insects described in 1928
Diptera of South America
Taxa named by Erwin Lindner